Crucibulum, commonly known as cup-and-saucer snails, is a genus of sea snails, marine gastropod mollusks in the  family Calyptraeidae.

Species 

Species within the genus Crucibulum include:
 Crucibulum auricula (Gmelin, 1791)
 Crucibulum concameratum Reeve, 1859
 † Crucibulum costatum (Say, 1820) 
 Crucibulum cyclopium Berry, 1969
 Crucibulum lignarium (Broderip, 1834)
 Crucibulum marense Weisbord, 1962
 Crucibulum monticulus Berry, 1969
 Crucibulum pectinatum Carpenter, 1856
 Crucibulum personatum Keen, 1958
 Crucibulum planum Schumacher, 1817
 Crucibulum quiriquinae (Lesson, 1830)
 Crucibulum scutellatum (W. Wood, 1828)
 Crucibulum serratum (Broderip, 1834)
 Crucibulum spinosum (Sowerby, 1824)
 Crucibulum springvaleense Rutsch, 1942
 Crucibulum striatum (Say, 1826)
 Crucibulum subactum Berry, 1963
 Crucibulum umbrella (Deshayes, 1830)
 Crucibulum waltonense Gardner, 1947
Species brought into synonymy
 Crucibulum extinctorium (Lamarck, 1822) : synonym of Calyptraea extinctorium Lamarck, 1822: synonym of Desmaulus extinctorium (Lamarck, 1822)
 Crucibulum renovatum Crosse & P. Fischer, 1890: synonym of Calyptraea renovata (Crosse & P. Fischer, 1890) (original combination)

References

Calyptraeidae
Gastropod genera